The lists of law clerks of the Supreme Court of the United States cover the law clerks who have assisted the justices of the Supreme Court of the United States in various capacities since the first one was hired by Justice Horace Gray in 1882. The list is divided into separate lists for each position in the Supreme Court.

Each justice is permitted to have three or four law clerks per Court term. Most clerks are recent law school graduates, who have typically graduated at the top of their class. Among their many functions, clerks do legal research that assists justices in deciding what cases to accept and what questions to ask during oral arguments, prepare memoranda, and draft orders and opinions. Research suggests that clerks exert a moderate influence on how justices vote in cases, but have "substantial influence in cases that are high-profile, legally significant, or close decisions".

Lists 

 List of law clerks of the Supreme Court of the United States (Chief Justice)

 List of law clerks of the Supreme Court of the United States (Seat 1)

 List of law clerks of the Supreme Court of the United States (Seat 2)

 List of law clerks of the Supreme Court of the United States (Seat 3)

 List of law clerks of the Supreme Court of the United States (Seat 4)

 List of law clerks of the Supreme Court of the United States (Seat 6)

 List of law clerks of the Supreme Court of the United States (Seat 8)

 List of law clerks of the Supreme Court of the United States (Seat 9)

 List of law clerks of the Supreme Court of the United States (Seat 10)

Note that, due to the several changes in the size of the Court since it was established in 1789, two seats have been abolished, both as a result of the Judicial Circuits Act of 1866 (and before the Court established the practice of hiring law clerks). Consequently, neither "seat 5" nor "seat 7" has a list article. Also, the seat numbers in these articles are not derived from official United States federal government sources, but are used as a way of organizing and detailing the succession of justices over the years since the first set of justices were confirmed by the United States Senate.

References